The February 2015 North American cold wave was an extreme weather event that affected most of Canada and the eastern half of the United States. Following an earlier cold wave in the winter, the period of below-average temperatures contributed to an already unusually cold winter for the Eastern U.S. Several places broke their records for their coldest February on record, while some areas came very close. The cause of the cold wave was due to the polar vortex advancing southward into the eastern parts of the U.S, and even making it as far south as the Southeast, where large snow falls are rare. By the beginning of March, although the pattern did continue for the first week, it abated and retreated near the official end of the winter.

Origins 
Like most American cold waves, this was caused by the southward movement of the polar vortex into the United States due to changes in the  jet stream in early February 2015. However, unlike most which last for a few days, this one remained for much of the entire month. This was partly due to the Ridiculously Resilient Ridge, which persisted over parts of Alaska for much of the month, essentially keeping the jet stream pattern "locked" for several weeks. This allowed for bitterly cold air masses to migrate southward into the eastern part of the country, leading to well-below average temperatures.

Record temperatures

United States
Hartford, Connecticut, and Providence, Rhode Island, saw similar below-average temperatures for the two months, with Hartford's February finish of  besting February 1934 to become the coldest month of any month all-time in record keeping.

They saw a record 25 days below . However, records don’t go back as far as they do in Central Park.

It was also the second time in history that the entire month of February was below freezing. Rochester, New York, also set a record for coldest month overall.

In February 2015, nine states (Connecticut, Maine, Massachusetts, New Hampshire, New York, Ohio, Pennsylvania and Vermont) had their second coldest February. New York and Vermont had it’s coldest first quarter on record in 2015.

During the cold wave, several intense bursts of Arctic air intruded down the Eastern United States. An arctic blast on February 20 was even more intense. Several cities in Ohio, such as Toledo, Youngstown and Cleveland set or tie monthly record lows. Even Key West, Florida reached , setting a daily record low. Crestview, further north in the state, reached . In the second cold snap, a man was found dead in Coney Island. In addition, ice on the Hudson River forced several Circle Line boat tours to be cancelled.

Canada

The province of Quebec as a whole averaged , making it the coldest February in provincial history. Some cities fared especially poorly, such as Quebec City, which realized an average temperature of only .

Related weather 
Most of the northern half of the United States and most of Canada saw several winter storms impact them; each of them had somewhat unique traits. At the start of the month, a major snowstorm was moving across the country, having previously brought blizzard conditions to the Midwest, especially in Chicago, Illinois, where more than a foot of snow was recorded. This storm continued to dump large amounts of snow as it progressed into the Northeast and New England, before finally exiting offshore.

This was the beginning of a three-week streak of winter storms that would progress into the Northeast (with the expectation of one system which went further south).

Around the middle of the month, near Valentine's Day, a powerful blizzard struck the Northeast again, bringing strong winds and more heavy snowfall. Several places broke record lows for February, and temperatures even dipped below  in a good part of the Northeast.

Several more winter storms followed afterward, but one of the more notable ones was the one that occurred from February 25–26. This particular storm took an unusual track into the Southeastern United States as the jet stream along with the polar vortex pushed even further southward, resulting in heavy snowfall in states that rarely see it at all, this included Mississippi, Alabama, Georgia, and the Carolinas. Up to  fell in the hardest hit areas, which was in North Carolina and Virginia.

Due to the cold wave, February 2015 saw only two tornadoes. In addition, Great Lakes ice extent reached its 3rd highest on record.

See also

 Early 2014 North American cold wave
 
 January 31 – February 2, 2015 North American blizzard
 Mid-February 2015 North American blizzard

References

2014–15 North American winter
2015 disasters in Canada
Cold wave
North American cold wave
2015 cold waves
Natural disasters in Massachusetts
Natural disasters in Virginia